The 2021–22 Munster Rugby season was Munster's twenty-first season competing in the United Rugby Championship, alongside which they also competed in the European Rugby Champions Cup. It was Johann van Graan's fifth and final season as head coach.

Events
The big news in terms of player movements ahead of the 2021–22 season was the retirement of three club stalwarts: Billy Holland, CJ Stander and Tommy O'Donnell, and the return to the province of the club's record try scorer Simon Zebo after three seasons with French club Racing 92.

Fly-half JJ Hanrahan left the province to join French club Clermont, whilst winger Alex Wootton departed to join Connacht on a permanent basis, having spent the previous season on loan at the western province. Scrum-half Nick McCarthy left to re-join his native province Leinster, whilst prop James Cronin joined French club Biarritz, who had recently been promoted to the Top 14, and hooker Rhys Marshall was released by the province and returned to New Zealand, where he joined North Harbour. Centre Alex McHenry joined English club Wasps on loan in October 2021, and new signing Declan Moore joined Ulster as short-term injury cover in late December 2021 and on loan in February 2022.

Nine academy players were promoted to the senior squad: Thomas Ahern, Jack Crowley, Jack Daly, Jake Flannery, James French, Seán French, Ben Healy, John Hodnett and Josh Wycherley. South African lock Jason Jenkins joined the senior squad from Japanese club Toyota Verblitz, scrum-half Rowan Osborne joined from Leinster, and hooker Declan Moore, who was on the books with Australian Super Rugby side Melbourne Rebels, joined for the season. Shannon scrum-half Aran Hehir joined the senior squad in late February 2022 to provide cover whilst Craig Casey, Ethan Coughlan and Conor Murray were away on international duty and Rowan Osborne was injured.

In coaching news, former Munster assistant coach Ian Costello returned to the province to become their academy manager, having spent the previous five seasons working in England as head coach of RFU Championship club Nottingham and, since 2018, defence coach at Premiership club Wasps. Sports psychologist Caroline Currid, renowned in Ireland for her work with the Limerick hurlers who won back-to-back All-Ireland's in 2020 and 2021, joined the province's backroom team in a part-time role.

Three players joined year one of the academy: prop Mark Donnelly, back-row Daniel Okeke and scrum-half Ethan Coughlan, whilst Leinster academy scrum-half Paddy Patterson, who spent part of the previous season on a short-term contract with Munster, joined year three of the academy. Three additional players joined the academy in November 2021: lock Edwin Edogbo, fly-half Tony Butler and back-three Patrick Campbell.

The teams were divided into regional pools, with Munster joining their provincial rivals Connacht, Leinster and Ulster in the Irish pool. The regular season took place over 18 rounds; Munster played their pool opponents home and away, and played home or away fixtures against the other 12 teams in the league. All sixteen teams were ranked in one league table after the 18 rounds, with the top 8 teams qualifying for the quarter-finals, followed by semi-finals and a grand final.

Eight teams qualified from the United Rugby Championship for the Champions Cup. The highest ranked team from each pool qualified for the Champions Cup, with the remaining four qualification spots going to the next four highest-ranked teams in the single league table who have not already qualified from their pool. Subject to approvals, the South African teams will be eligible for the Champions & Challenge Cup.

The province was drawn in pool B for the 2021–22 European Rugby Champions Cup pool stage, and faced French club Castres, whom Munster have met in nine previous Champions Cup seasons in a record 16 fixtures, and English club Wasps, who defeated Munster in a classic semi-final in the old Lansdowne Road in 2004, and whom the province last met during the 2007–08 tournament, which Munster went on to win.

Munster opened their 2021–22 United Rugby Championship campaign with a bonus-point 42–17 win against the Sharks, one of the four new South African teams, on 25 September 2021. Simon Zebo, making his return for the province, scored two tries, extending his club record to 62, with Gavin Coombes continuing his try-scoring exploits from the previous season with two tries of his own. Chris Cloete and player of the match Craig Casey also crossed the try line. Fly-half Joey Carbery scored seven points off the kicking tee, with his replacement Ben Healy contributing five points off the tee in the second-half. RG Snyman made his eagerly-awaited return from long-term injury as a second-half replacement, and scrum-half Rowan Osborne made his competitive debut for the province, in a match that saw fans return to Thomond Park for the first time since February 2020.

In the wake of this disruption for Munster and other clubs, and with Munster's opening Champions Cup fixture away to Wasps falling on 12 December, the EPCR extended the deadline for registering players for the tournament to 8 December, meaning Munster could look to supplement their squad with short-term signings, and 22 players were subsequently registered with the province's Champions Cup squad.

A depleted Munster squad made up of internationals who'd been away with Ireland during the Autumn tests, academy players and members of the national and provincial talent squads travelled over to England to face Wasps on their opening Champions Cup fixture on 12 December 2021. The team, which featured 12 debutantes, pulled off one of the great Munster away victories, defeating their opponents 35–14 in a thrilling contest in front of a large contingent of Munster fans who had made the journey to Coventry.

Munster made it back-to-back wins in the Champions Cup with a gritty 19–13 win at home against French club Castres on 18 December 2021, with a 58th minute try from number 8 Jack O'Donoghue and 14 points off the tee from fly-half Ben Healy being enough for the province to see off their opposition.

Following the 10–8 defeat away to Connacht on 1 January 2022, the province received criticism for its style of play, or lack thereof, aimed in particular at head coach Johann van Graan, who had recently confirmed his departure from the province at the end of the season. Critics also pointed to the poor performance in defeat against the Ospreys back in October 2021, prior to the COVID-19 issues the province faced in South Africa and the first two rounds of the Champions Cup, and also to the dour win against Castres in round two of the Champions Cup. Former captain Donal Lenihan, writing in the Irish Examiner, said: "If Munster continue in the vein of the last two limp attacking efforts against Castres and Connacht, then you can forget about any prospect of breaking the trophy drought for another season,", whilst club legend Alan Quinlan described the performance against Connacht as "dreadful", before adding; "Look, you have to acknowledge there has been a lot of good in the last few years, I do want to say that.".

Eddie O'Sullivan, former Ireland coach and Munster player, added: "If you want a cameo to show people how Munster have not developed in attack, show them the last five minutes of that first half against Connacht.". Keith Wood, another former Munster player and an Ireland legend, was similarly critical of the province, describing the display against Connacht as "turgid nonsense", adding "There's no point in talking about Munster's attack, that doesn’t exist at the present moment in time. I think we're beginning to ruin some of the players. I'm finding it incredibly hard to watch." Munster forwards coach Graham Rowntree, speaking to the media ahead of the province's fixture against Ulster the following week, described the performance as "more than disappointing" and "very frustrating", but added that a series of clear-the-air meetings had been held, saying "It can only be good to get it all out on the table and clear the air and people air some things.".

In the reverse fixture against Castres in round 3 of the Champions Cup on 14 January 2022, Munster earned a 16–13 away win thanks to a 77th minute try from Gavin Coombes, converted by rookie fly-half Jack Crowley, who was faultless off the kicking tee in his first European start for the province. The win secured a place in the knockout stage of the tournament for Munster. Nine days later, Munster followed up their away win against Castres with a 45–7 home win against Wasps, with the tries coming from Jeremy Loughman, Conor Murray, Jack O'Donoghue, who was player of the match on the occasion of his 150th cap for Munster, Rory Scannell and Simon Zebo, who scored a brace to become Munster's all-time leading try-scorer in the Champions Cup and the leading Irish try-scorer in the competition overall. Fly-half Ben Healy and his replacement on the day, Jack Crowley, were both 100% from the kicking tee, with Healy scoring four conversions and a penalty, and Crowley adding two late conversions. The win secured home advantage for Munster in the second leg of the round of 16.

Munster faced English club Exeter Chiefs in the round of 16, and lost the first leg of the tie 13–8 away to the Premiership club on 9 April 2022. Exeter took a 10–0 lead in to half-time after tries from Stuart Hogg and Jacques Vermeulen, before Munster fly-half Ben Healy hit back with a penalty to reduce the home sides lead. Hogg responded for Exeter with a drop-goal, but a 66th minute try from Shane Daly brought Munster back within touching distance on the scoreboard, and Exeter had to withstand some intense offensive play from Munster going into the final ten minutes, with replacement scrum-half Craig Casey almost drawing the scores level, before the hosts themselves assaulted the Munster try-line in the last minutes of the match in an ultimately unsuccessful attempt to extend their lead.

Needing to overturn a five point deficit to advance in the competition, Munster welcomed Exeter to Thomond Park for the second leg of their last 16 tie one week later. Fly-half Joey Carbery, returning from injury, opened the scoring for the hosts with a penalty, but the visitors responded with their first try of the game to take an early 5–3 lead, before Carbery struck back for Munster with a try of his own, to which he added a second penalty to give Munster a 13–5 half-time lead. Exeter struck first in the second-half with a try in the 47th minute, but Carbery kept Munster in front with two further penalties, before centre Damian de Allende scored a 74th minute try to secure a 26–10 home win for Munster and a 34–23 victory on aggregate, ensuring Munster progressed to a record 19th Champions Cup quarter-final.

Facing defending champions Toulouse, who knocked the province out of the previous season's tournament, in the quarter-final, Munster began strongly with an 11th minute Alex Kendellen try, converted by Joey Carbery to lead 7–0, but Romain Ntamack hit back for Toulouse two minutes later with a try of his own, converted by Thomas Ramos, to level the scores. The visitors were dominating the scrum and scored their second try in the 25th minute when Matthis Lebel touched down, with Ramos again converting to give Toulouse a 14–7 lead. However, Munster struck back with a Keith Earls try just before half-time which Carbery converted to leave the scores level heading into the break. The home side came out firing in the second-half, with Mike Haley scoring a 43rd minute try, again converted by Carbery, to give Munster a 21–14 lead, which Carbery extended with a penalty in the 56th minute, but Toulouse responded with Lebel's second try in the 66th minute which, when converted by Ramos, reduced the margin to just three points heading into the final ten minutes. A 75th minute penalty from Ramos levelled the scores at 24–24, and that remained the score at full-time after Ben Healy missed with a 56 metre penalty attempt in the final minute of normal time.

With the scores level at full-time and as both teams scored three tries, extra time ensued, played over two ten-minute halves, but even after that the two teams could not be separated after three missed drop goals between the two, and the game went to a penalty shootout. Munster went first and Conor Murray scored his penalty. Antoine Dupont responded successfully for Toulouse, but Ben Healy missed his first attempt, and when Thomas Ramos scored his penalty, it was advantage Toulouse. Carbery scored his penalty, but Romain Ntamack scored his own to restore Toulouse's lead. Murray missed with his second attempt, whilst Dupont was successful with his own to give Toulouse a 4–2 lead, meaning Healy had to score with his second attempt to give Munster any hope, but he was unable to do so, and Toulouse advanced to the semi-finals, knocking Munster out of the competition for the second season in a row.

A 35–25 defeat away to Leinster in round 18 of the 2021–22 United Rugby Championship meant that Munster finished sixth in the league overall, and third in the Irish Shield, and the province headed north to face Ulster in the quarter-finals on 3 June 2022, but Munster lost 36–17 to bring the curtain down on their 2021–22 season, as well as Johann van Graan's tenure as head coach.

Player movements
Below are the players who joined and left the Munster senior and academy squads ahead of the 2021–22 season. Italics indicates players that transferred during the 2021–22 season.

Senior squad

Players in
 Jake Flannery promoted from Academy
 James French promoted from Academy
 Seán French promoted from Academy
 Ben Healy promoted from Academy
 John Hodnett promoted from Academy
 Thomas Ahern promoted from Academy
 Jack Crowley promoted from Academy
 Jack Daly promoted from Academy
 Jason Jenkins from  Toyota Verblitz
 Josh Wycherley promoted from Academy
 Simon Zebo from  Racing 92
 Rowan Osborne from  Leinster
 Declan Moore from  Sydney University
 Aran Hehir from  Shannon (short-term cover)

Players out
 Billy Holland retired
 Alex Wootton to  Connacht
 CJ Stander retired
 JJ Hanrahan to  Clermont
 Nick McCarthy to  Leinster
 Tommy O'Donnell retired
 James Cronin to  Biarritz
 Rhys Marshall to  North Harbour
 Alex McHenry to  Wasps (loan)
 Declan Moore to  Ulster (injury cover & loan)

Academy squad

Players in
 Ethan Coughlan
 Mark Donnelly
 Daniel Okeke
 Paddy Patterson from  Leinster
 Tony Butler
 Patrick Campbell
 Edwin Edogbo

Players out

Coaches and staff
Senior squad

Academy squad

Players

Senior squad

Academy squad

Additional players
These 19 players were registered with Munster's Champions Cup squad in December 2021 following the disruption caused by the province's recent tour to South Africa, and are National Talent Squad or Provincial Talent Squad members. They are not contracted to Munster. Three additional academy members - Tony Butler, Patrick Campbell and Edwin Edogbo - were also registered for the squad and are listed in the academy squad above.

Pre-season

2021–22 United Rugby Championship

Round 1

Round 2

Round 3

Round 4

Round 5

Round 6

Fixture postponed due to COVID-19 pandemic-related travel restrictions.

Round 7

Fixture postponed due to COVID-19 pandemic-related travel restrictions.

Round 8

Fixture postponed due to COVID-19 cases amongst the Leinster squad.

Round 9

Round 10

Round 11

Rescheduled round 18

Round 12

Round 13

Rescheduled round 6

Rescheduled round 7

Round 14

Rescheduled round 8

Round 16

Round 17

Rescheduled round 15

Quarter-final

2021–22 European Rugby Champions Cup

Munster were ranked second out of the eight United Rugby Championship teams that qualified for the 2021–22 Champions Cup, owing to their runners-up position after defeat against Leinster in the 2021 Pro14 Grand Final, and were seeded in tier one for the pool stage draw. The province was drawn in pool B for the 2021–22 European Rugby Champions Cup pool stage, and faced French club Castres and English club Wasps.

Round 1

Round 2

Round 3

Round 4

Round of 16 (1st leg)

Round of 16 (2nd leg)

Munster won 34–23 on aggregate.

Quarter-final

2021–22 Munster A/Development season

Player statistics
Player statistics from the 2021–22 season. Stats from the league and European competitions only are shown. Academy players in italics. † indicates additional players used who are not contracted. Updated 4 June 2022 after URC quarter-final

References

Notes

External links
Official Munster website
URC Munster
EPCR Munster

2021-22
2021–22 United Rugby Championship by team
2021–22 in Irish rugby union
2021–22 European Rugby Champions Cup by team